Jen Atkin (born March 10, 1980) is an American hairstylist, entrepreneur, and columnist. Atkin is the co-owner of the hair care line OUAI with Lamees Hamdan, the documented founder of OUAI. Atkin is also the founder of the digital magazine ManeAddicts, and works as a columnist for Glamour Magazine. She has worked with Chrissy Teigen, Jennifer Lopez, Gigi and Bella Hadid, as well as members of the Kardashian family.

Career
Atkin moved to Los Angeles to pursue a career in hairstyling at the age of 19 with only 300 dollars.  Lorraine Schwartz helped Atkin when she first moved to LA. In 2000, she began working as a receptionist at Estilo Salon in West Hollywood. Later, Atkin worked at the Chris McMillan and Andy LeCompte salons in Hollywood. In 2006, Atkin worked on the hair team for Madonna's Confessions Tour. She also worked as a personal hairstylist for fashion designer John Galliano. While working for Galliano, Atkin travelled to Paris to work fashion shows which enabled her to forge professional connections.

Atkin has worked frequently with the Kardashian-Jenner family, including styling their hair for the interview portions of the reality show, Keeping Up with the Kardashians. Atkin began working with Kim in 2010 on a shoot for Cosmopolitan. She met Khloe during the shoot, who asked her to create her looks for The X Factor, which led to her continuing to work with the rest of the family. Atkin was featured on Kim Kardashian's video game, Kim Kardashian: Hollywood. On several occasions, Atkin has collaborated with hairstylist and wigmaker Tokyo Stylez to create looks for Kylie Jenner.

Since 2012, Atkin has traveled regularly to the Middle East, where she cuts hair at salons in Dubai, Bahrain, and Qatar. She has discussed her motivation for working in this region, stating, "there are not a lot of trained stylists in the Middle East who know how to do modern curls, or know how to really cut thick, coarse hair in a way that grows out nicely." Occasionally, Atkin also cuts hair in Los Angeles at Andy LeCompte Salon, where her appointments cost upwards of $600. Atkin is well known on Instagram and credits her social media marketing skills to scrapbooking during her childhood. She released a hair accessories collection called Jen Atkin X Chloe + Isabel, a line which is no longer in production.

Her first book, Blowing My Way to the Top, was published by Harper Collins in December 2020.

OUAI
Atkin and Dr. Lamees Hamdan, Dubai-based founder of luxury beauty brand Shiffa, cofounded the hair care line OUAI in 2015 with Atkin acting as the face of the brand. She wanted the line to be developed by a community rather than "a lot of men in boardrooms." The brand is based out of Los Angeles, and its products are available online for purchase. OUAI also offers product subscription services. The name comes from an informal way of saying the French word "oui," and is meant to sound casual and unpretentious. The brand has since partnered with Sephora to put the product in stores after Atkin realized there was a market for both online and in-store sales. In 2019, OUAI launched its first body care product.

ManeAddicts
In 2014, Atkin began a digital magazine aimed at hair education alongside some of her colleagues. She serves as the magazine's creative director, providing tutorials and hair advice. The magazine also features interviews with famous hairstylists, such as Harry Josh.

Mane University
Mane University is the name of the educational courses and seminars provided by ManeAddicts. Atkin and other famous hairstylists, such as Rita Hazan, teach classes on hair products and styling hair.

Personal life
Atkin was born in Ecuador, but spent her childhood between the North Shore of Oahu and St. George, Utah. She was raised Mormon. At the age of 19, she moved to Los Angeles with her best friend to pursue hair with only $300 and her Honda Civic. 

Atkin dated director and photographer Mike Rosenthal for five years before they became engaged. Prior to his proposal while on vacation in Greece, they had never discussed marriage. They married in 2016 at the Jardin du Luxembourg in Paris, which is where Rosenthal took her on their first date. They were in Paris attending another wedding when they decided to elope. Atkin, Rosenthal, and the officiant were the only people in attendance. 

Atkin previously stated that she and Rosenthal were focused on their careers, but wanted children "one day," and spoken openly about their decision to freeze their embryos. On March 21, 2021, Atkin posted on Instagram that she and Rosenthal had welcomed a child, River Julién Rosenthal, on March 5 of the same year via a surrogate. On April 10, 2022, Atkin announced the birth of her second child with Rosenthal, a daughter named Sloane Soleil Rosenthal, born on March 31, 2022. They live on Miracle Mile in Los Angeles, although she often splits her time between Los Angeles and New York. Atkin considers herself a feminist.

Awards
2015 Stylemaker of the Year

Filmography

References

External links
Official website

1980 births
Living people
American hairdressers
People from Utah